James Kehoe may refer to:
 James Nicholas Kehoe (1862–1945), American politician from Kentucky
 James W. Kehoe (1925–1998), American judge
 Jim Kehoe (1918–2010), American athletic director
 James J. Kehoe, American politician from New York